Vladica Grujic (born 22 October 1962) is a Serbian football manager and former player and also holds Austrian citizenship. He is the assistant coach of Japanese club Machida Zelvia.

Playing career
Grujic started his playing career in Austria and played for different clubs in first and second division club as forward.

Coaching career
Grujic started his playing career as player cum coach and after managing Austrian clubs he became the assistant coach of Hans-Peter Schaller in Laos national football team in 2011.

He also served as an assistant coach of Ranko Popović for different clubs in different countries. In 2013 he appointed as the assistant coach of FC Tokyo and he also worked as the caretaker for some games. In 2014 he left the club with Popović. He also worked as an assistant coach of Cerezo Osaka in 2014 . In November 2014 he appointed as the assistant coach of Real zaragoza under Popović and stayed with them until the dismissal of Popović in December 2015. After the zaragoza job he again united with Popović in Buriram United in 2016.  After the Thailand stint he appointed as the assistant coach of  Pune City in Indian Super League in 2017. He also worked as the caretaker manager of the club after the suspension of Popović.  In 2018 he returned to Austria again with Popović at  SKN St. Pölten his old club.

References

1962 births
Living people
Yugoslav footballers
Association football forwards
Serbia and Montenegro footballers
Austrian Football Bundesliga players
LUV Graz players
SKN St. Pölten players
SV Spittal players
FC Gratkorn players
FK Radnički Niš players
OFK Beograd players
Serbian football managers
FC Pune City managers
Serbia and Montenegro expatriate footballers
Serbia and Montenegro expatriate sportspeople in Austria
Expatriate footballers in Austria